Mychal is a masculine given name. Notable people with the name include:

Mychal Ammons (born 1992), American basketball player
Mychal Givens (born 1990), American baseball pitcher
Mychal Green (born 1983), American basketball player
Mychal Kearse (born 1983), American basketball player
Mychal Kendricks (born 1990), American football linebacker
Mychal Judge (1933-2001), American priest
Mychal Mulder (born 1994), Canadian basketball player
Mychal Rivera (born 1990), American football tight end
Mychal Sisson (born 1988), American football player
Mychal Denzel Smith (born 1986), American writer
Mychal Springer, Rabbi
Mychal Thompson (born 1955), Bahamian basketball player

Middle name

Brandon Mychal Smith (born 1989), American actor
Alana Mychal Haim Grammy nominated singer

See also
Michael